Robin Wagner may refer to:

Robin Wagner (figure skater), American figure skating coach
Robin Wagner (designer) (born 1933), American scenic designer
Robin Wagner (cyclist) (born 1993), Czech cyclist